Koksijde Air Base  is a Belgian Air Component facility in Koksijde,  north northwest of Veurne, Belgium. 40 Squadron, historically operating 5 Westland Sea King Mk.48 helicopters for search and rescue (SAR) duties. Also based at Koksijde Air Base were Aérospatiale Alouette III helicopters. The Westland Sea King Mk.48 and Alouette III helicopters were replaced with NH90 NFH helicopters starting in March 2012.

It features two airframes as gateguard: a Hawker Hunter F.4, and a Sikorsky S-58C, both ex-Belgian Air Force. Finally, one more Sikorsky S-58C is stored and used for static displays.

This base was featured in the popular TV show "Windkracht 10" and in the movie Windkracht 10: Koksijde Rescue.

Like many Belgian Air bases, both active and non-active, it is available to private recreational aviation during weekends.

During World War II, the base was used by the German Luftwaffe.  In 1942, one of their assignments was fighter protection for the German battleships Scharnhorst and Gneisenau and the heavy cruiser Prinz Eugen, when these ships successfully broke out from Brest, in France, through the English Channel to Germany. One of the Luftwaffe pilots based at Koksijde who was involved was Heinz-Wolfgang Schnaufer, who eventually became the highest-scoring night fighter ace in the history of aerial warfare.

See also
 40th Squadron Heli

References

External links

 Koksijde Air Base - WikiAirports

Airports established in 1915
Belgian airbases
Airports in West Flanders
Koksijde